Qualitrol is a condition monitoring technology company headquartered in Fairport, New York. Qualitrol manufacturers and distributes partial discharge monitoring, asset protection equipment and information products for the electrical generation, transmission and distribution industries.

The company also offers customer training and field services, such as on-site start-up and testing, customized maintenance, product upgrades, troubleshooting, and repair services. It serves customers in Asia Pacific, Europe, the Middle East, Latin America, and North America.

Qualitrol is a subsidiary of the Fortive industrial conglomerate.

History

George Ford
George Ford, the founder of Qualitrol, was born in 1907 in Barrie, Ontario, Canada, the son of Thomas Henry Ford and Rachel Mary Jones. His family moved to Rochester, New York when he was a child, where he completed his secondary education and then graduated as an engineer from the University of Rochester.

Ford became aware of a major deficiency in the manufacture of heavy electronic transformers and generators of diesel engines. He identified the risks of unexpected accidents while using gas and flame without protective devices. At the age of 38, Ford left his position as Vice President of Engineering at the Rochester Manufacturing Company to establish a new company using seed money from his brother-in-law, Mort Watters, and from his mother-in-law, Rose Gavin.

Founding and expansion
In 1945 Ford founded Qualitrol Corporation in Fairport, New York, and began to provide the electric utility industry with protective devices and monitoring systems. Ford opened a branch of Qualitrol in Waynesboro, Tennessee to manufacture valves. Later, Mr. Ford bought Microcontrol in St. Louis, Missouri, a manufacturer of thermostats, and the Dynapar Corporation  in Gurney, Illinois a manufacturer of digital controls.

In the late 1960s, Ford sold all of his business interests to devote more time to his love of sports.

Acquisition by Danaher
Within two years of  Danaher Corporation's founding in 1984, it acquired twelve companies as part of a strategy to enter manufacturing. In 1986, Danaher Corporation acquired Qualitrol, establishing Qualitrol LLC. Qualitrol became part of Danaher's instrumentation unit, which included Gilbarco Veeder-Root's underground fuel storage sensors, Dynapar's motion sensors, and Qualitrol's pressure and temperature measurement instruments used on the electrical transformer industry. Danaher spun off several subsidiaries, including Qualitrol, in 2016 to create Fortive.

Acquisition by Fortive
Qualitrol became part of Fortive in July, 2016.

Corporate affairs
At the end of 2007, Qualitrol started to collaborate with Quebec City-based Neoptix Inc., a manufacturer of fiber optic temperature sensors. Initially, Qualitrol and Neoptix worked together on the integration of data collected simultaneously from traditional methods of temperature measurement and from optical direct hot-spot sensors. Subsequently, Neoptix became a sole subsidiary of Qualitrol.

In 2010, Qualitrol acquired Mississauga, Ontario-based Iris Power, a supplier of on-line partial discharge testing of stator winding insulation in large motors and generators, from subsidiaries of Koch Chemical Technology Group, LLC, a Wichita-based multinational. Qualitrol thereby acquired a fleet of portable and continuous instruments and monitoring systems that are integrated into a power plant's Distributed Control System (DCS) or a Supervisory Control and Data Acquisition (SCADA) system.

Subsidiaries
Qualitrol
Iris Power LP
Neoptix Fiber Optics LP
BPL Global (Serveron)

Executive management
President: Andrew McCauley
Vice President of Marketing and Business Development: 
Vice President of Expert Services: Joseph Mbuyi
Vice President Finance: Shane Murphy
Vice President Human Resources: Tom Hodge
Vice President of R&D : Anis Zribi

Divisions
Asset Protection
Transmission and Distribution
Condition monitoring for Transmission and Distribution
Condition monitoring for Generation
Services

Products

Asset protection
Temperature Measurement Devices
Pressure Controls, Gauges, and Relays
Transformer Monitors
Liquid Level
Flow
Gas
Breaker Monitors, SF6 Controls and Gauges

Transmission and distribution
Fault Recording and Fault Location
Power Quality Monitoring
Sequential Events Recording and Alarm Annunciation
Multifunction Software

Condition monitoring
Transformer Monitors
Breaker Monitors, SF6 Controls and Gauges
Partial Discharge
Cable Monitoring

Global operations
Qualitrol also has manufacturing facilities in Belfast, and Mississauga. The Belfast facility focuses on Qualitrol instruments and the Glasgow facility is now defunct and dissolved, merged with Belfast. The Quebec City unit operates as Neoptix and the Mississauga unit operates under Iris Power. Though each location specializes, projects are worked on by teams in multiple locations.

Qualitrol adheres to the standards of international organizations, including the Institute of Electrical and Electronics Engineers Standards Association (IEEE-SA) and the International Council on Large Electric Systems (CIGRE).

Offices

References

External links 
Qualitrol LLC

Technology companies established in 1945
Electronics companies of the United States
Engineering companies of the United States
Manufacturing companies based in New York (state)
Companies based in Monroe County, New York
Electronic test equipment manufacturers
1945 establishments in New York (state)
1986 mergers and acquisitions